Jacques Louis César Alexandre Randon, 1st Count Randon (25 March 1795 – 16 January 1871) was a French military and political leader, also Marshal of France and governor of Algeria.

Early life
He was born at Grenoble in Dauphiné, of a Protestant family. Later in life he converted to Catholicism, under the influence of his second wife. He was a nephew of General Jean-Gabriel, Count Marchand, Also a Revolutionary Antoine-Joseph Barnave was a first cousin of his mother.

He enlisted in the French Army at sixteen, joined his uncle Marchand in Warsaw and was promoted to sergeant on 11 April 1812. He took part in the Russian Campaign, the taking of Moscow and the retreat back. He then fought in Napoleon's campaigns in Germany and France, notably at the battles of Lützen, Bautzen and Leipzig.

Middle life
He was Minister of War from January to October 1851, after which he was appointed Governor-General of Algerie (11 December 1851 to 31 August 1858). Although initially not in favour of the coup of December 1851, he finally rallied the Second French Empire. He was made a Count in 1852 (by reversion of the title of his uncle General Marchand), and Marshal of France in 1856, at the same time as Canrobert and Bosquet. He served again as Minister of War from 1859 to 1867.

In 1859, botanist Ernest Saint-Charles Cosson published Randonia, a monotypic genus of flowering plant from North Africa, belonging to the family Resedaceae and was named in Jacques Louis Randon's honour.

Later life

He received no command during the Franco-Prussian War in 1870, because of his high age. He was nevertheless accused to have a part of responsibility in French defeat for having neglected to prepare for it during his second ministry and for having dissuaded Napoleon III of acting in favour of Austria at the time of the Battle of Sadova in 1866. Modern research has shown that the latter accusation is unfounded and that, quite contrarily, Randon had advocated an immediate action against Prussia.

Randon died on 16 January 1871 in Geneva, leaving one surviving daughter.

The Marshal's first wife, Clotilde Périer, was a sister of Casimir Périer, who had been President of the Council during the July Monarchy and the grandfather of Jean Casimir-Périer, President of the French Republic. Marshal Randon later remarried to Zénaïde Suin.

References

1795 births
1871 deaths
Politicians from Grenoble
French Roman Catholics
Converts to Roman Catholicism from Protestantism
Bonapartists
French Ministers of War
People of the French Second Republic
French Senators of the Second Empire
Governors general of Algeria
Marshals of France
French military personnel of the Napoleonic Wars
19th-century Protestants
19th-century Roman Catholics
Military personnel from Grenoble